Vaishampayan is a surname. Notable people with the surname include:

Bharati Vaishampayan (1954–2020), Indian singer
Mugdha Vaishampayan (born 2000), Indian singer
Vishwanath Vaishampayan (1910–1967), Indian revolutionary

See also
 Vaishampayana, the legendary narrator of the Mahabharata